Andrea Motis (born May 9, 1995) is a Spanish jazz singer and trumpeter who sings in Catalan, Spanish, Portuguese and English.

Biography

From the age of seven, Motis developed 
musically at the Municipal School of Music of Sant Andreu, a neighborhood of Barcelona, becoming the school's lead trumpeter and later saxophonist. In 2007, at twelve, she began to collaborate with the Sant Andreu Jazz Band, led by teacher and musician Joan Chamorro.

In 2010, at the age of fifteen, she recorded an album of jazz standards, Joan Chamorro Presents Andrea Motis. In 2012, she went on to record a second album, Feeling Good. She made her major label debut with Emotional Dance (Impulse!, 2017).

Discography
 Joan Chamorro presenta Andrea Motis (Temps, 2010)
 Motis Chamorro Quintet Live at Jamboree featuring Scott Hamilton (Swit, 2013)
 Live at Casa Fuster (2014)
 Feeling Good with Joan Chamorro (Temps, 2012; Whaling City Sound, 2015)
 Coses Que Es Diuen Però Que No Es Fan, NewCat, Andrea Motis Joan Chamorro (DiscMedi, 2015)
 Motis Chamorro Big Band Live (2015)
 Joan Chamorro presenta La magia de la veu  (Jazz to Jazz, 2015)
 Live at Palau de la Música (Jazz to Jazz, 2015)
 He's Funny That Way (Impulse!, 2016)
 Joan Chamorro presenta La magia de la veu & jazz ensemble  (Jazz to Jazz, 2016)
 Emotional Dance (Impulse!, 2017)
 Concert de les Festes Majors d'Amposta 2018 amb Andrea Motis & Joan Chamorro Quartet  (YouTube)
 Do Outro Lado Do Azul (Verve, 2019
 Andrea Motis La Trompeta Silenciosa - una historia sobre el triunfo de la sencillez (dvd 2019)
 Colors & shadows, 2021
 Loopholes, 2022

Collaborations
 Sant Andreu Jazz Band, Jazzing 1 (Temps, 2009)
 Sant Andreu Jazz Band, Jazzing 2 (Temps, 2011)
 Marato de TV3 (2011)
 Sant Andreu Jazz Band, Jazzing 3 (Temps, 2012)
 Sant Andreu Jazz Band, Jazzing 4 Vol. 1 (Temps, 2014)
 Sant Andreu Jazz Band, Jazzing 4 Vol. 2 (Temps, 2014) traditionnel d’ancêtres impulse 2017
 Miles Tribute Big Band, Sketches of Catalonia'' (2015)

References

External links
 Concierto de Andrea Motis y Joan Chamorro Group at the 43rd International Jazz Festival of Barcelona.
 Barcelona TV: La galeria dels oficis: Andrea Motis y Joan Chamorro (Músics).
 Montuno.com
 Zaragozajazz.com

1995 births
Living people
Musicians from Barcelona
Spanish jazz trumpeters
Spanish jazz saxophonists
Spanish jazz singers
21st-century Spanish singers
Women jazz saxophonists